Merck-Saint-Liévin is a commune in the Pas-de-Calais department in the Hauts-de-France region of France.

Geography
Merck-Saint-Liévin lies about 10 miles (16 km) southwest of Saint-Omer, on the D225 roads. The river Aa flows through the village.

Toponym
The name apparently refers to Saint Livinus of Ghent (martyred in 657 or 663), an Irish bishop who evangelized Flanders and Brabant, and is highly venerated in northern France.

Population

Places of interest
 An eighteenth-century mill.
 The church of St. Omer, dating from the seventeenth century

See also
Communes of the Pas-de-Calais department

References

External links

 Statistical data, INSEE

Mercksaintlievin